The women's cross-country cycling event at the 2012 Olympic Games in London took place at Hadleigh Farm on 11 August.

Julie Bresset from France won the gold medal — the country's first in cycling at the 2012 Games. Germany's Sabine Spitz won silver and Georgia Gould of the United States took bronze.

Competition format

The competition began at 12:30 pm with a mass-start, and involved six laps around the 4.8 km course at Hadleigh Farm in Essex. The distance of the race was 29.3 km.

Schedule 
All times are British Summer Time

Result
The entry list was published on 26 July.

References

Cycling at the 2012 Summer Olympics
2012 Women's
2012 in women's mountain biking
Women's events at the 2012 Summer Olympics